Dominicus Gundissalinus, also known as Domingo Gundisalvi or Gundisalvo ( 1115 – post 1190), was a philosopher and translator of Arabic to Medieval Latin active in Toledo. Among his translations, Gundissalinus worked on Avicenna's Liber de philosophia prima and De anima, Ibn Gabirol's Fons vitae, and al-Ghazali's Summa theoricae philosophiae, in collaboration with the Jewish philosopher Abraham Ibn Daud and Johannes Hispanus. As a philosopher, Gundissalinus crucially contributed to the Latin assimilation of Arabic philosophy, being the first Latin thinker in receiving and developing doctrines, such as Avicenna's modal ontology or Ibn Gabirol's universal hylomorphism, that would soon be integrated into the thirteenth-century philosophical debate.

Life
Born presumably in the Iberian Peninsula around 1115–1125, Gundissalinus received his education in Chartres, supposedly following the teaching of William of Conches and Thierry of Chartres. Since 1148, Gundissalinus is in Castile: the capitular archives of Segovia refer to him as archdeacon of Cuéllar, a small town not far from Segovia, where he presumably spent around 14 years, regarding which almost no information is available. Following Ibn Daud's request to the archbishop of Toledo, John II, to start a series of translations into Latin of Avicenna's Kitab al-Shifāʾ, Gundissalinus moved to Toledo in 1161–1162, where he worked with Ibn Daud on the translation of Avicenna's De anima, realised before 1166.

Gundissalinus remained in Toledo for twenty years, collaborating with Abraham Ibn Daud and Johannes Hispanus to the realisation of around twenty translations of Arabic  works into Latin. In the Castilian capital, Gundissalinus also wrote his philosophical treatises. The Toledan chapter names Gundissalinus for the last time in 1178 but he presumably remained in Toledo at least until 1181, when a document written in Arabic mentions his name.

The last record witnessing Gundissalinus alive is the report of a meeting between the chapters of Segovia and Burgos, held in Segovia in 1190. It is probable that the last years of Gundissalinus's life were spent in that Castilian town, and he died sometime after 1190.

See also
Toledo School of Translators
Latin translations of the 12th century

Notes

References
Polloni, Nicola, 2017, Domingo Gundisalvo. Una introducción, Editorial Sindéresis, Madrid.

External links
Nicola Polloni, Domingo Gundisalvo. Filósofo de Frontera.

 Alexander Fidora, La Recepción de San Isidoro de Sevilla por Domingo Gundisalvo

Philosophers of science
Arabic–Latin translators
12th-century Spanish philosophers
12th-century translators
12th-century Latin writers
12th-century people from León and Castile